Le livre des sauvages au point de vue de la civilization was a 19th-century hoax manuscript.

The French missionary Emmanuel Domenech's work Manuscrit pictographique américain, précédé d'une notice sur l'idéographie des Peaux Rouges (Paris, 1860) was the result of an unintentional hoax. The German orientalist Julius Petzholdt declared that the manuscript consisted only of scribbling and incoherent illustrations in a local German dialect. Domenech maintained the authenticity of the manuscript in a pamphlet entitled La vérité sur le livre des sauvages (1861), which drew forth a reply from Petzholdt, translated into French (by Philippe Van der Haeghen) under the title of Le livre des sauvages au point de vue de la civilization Française (Brussels, 1861).

External links

References

19th-century manuscripts
19th-century hoaxes
1861 books